is a 1979 Japanese jidaigeki film directed by Hideo Gosha. It is based on Shōtarō Ikenami's novel of the same title.

Plot
Sasaio Heizaburo is a skilled sword samurai with amnesia. one day he meet Gomyo Kiyoemon. Kiyoemon gave him the name Tanigawa Yataro and starts using him as a hit man.

Cast
 Tatsuya Nakadai as Gomyo Kiyoemon
 Yoshio Harada as Tanigawa Yataro(Sasao Heizaburo)
 Tetsuro Tamba as Tanuma Ogitsugu
 Mikio Narita as Toramatsu
 Makoto Fujita as Kasuke
 Hajime Hana as Sukegorō
 Tatsuo Umemiya as Yaichi
 Kōji Yakusho as Kuwano 
 Hideo Murota as Sakimatsu
 Hideji Otaki as Jihei
 Eijirō Tōno as Shōgen
 Daisuke Ryu as Bunkichi
 Keiko Kishi as Omon
 Ayumi Ishida as Oriha
 Isao Natsuyagi as Matsu
 Sonny Chiba as Shimoguni Samon

Production
 Yoshinobu Nishioka - Art direction

References

External links

1979 films
Films directed by Hideo Gosha
Samurai films
Jidaigeki films
1970s Japanese-language films
1970s Japanese films